Thomas King (1858 – 16 March 1916) was a New Zealand astronomer.

Early life

King was born in Glasgow, Scotland and came to Auckland with his parents as an infant. He was educated at Auckland Grammar School. He later received private tuition in Wellington.

Carter Observatory

Thomas King took over the charge of the Carter Observatory in 1887 from the Reverend Arthur Stock, vicar of St Peters (former astronomer in charge of the Wellington time-ball station on Lambton House Quay).

King has an astronomical observatory facility named after him at Carter Observatory in Wellington, New Zealand.

Thomas King Observatory

The Thomas King Observatory in Wellington, near the Carter Observatory, is now in constant use following the restoration of it and its telescope.

In May 2001 Gordon Hudson began the refurbishment of the 5 inch Grubb Telescope housed in the Thomas King Observatory. This telescope was made in 1882 by Grubb in Dublin and over its 120 years it is in remarkably good condition.

Death

King died on 16 March 1916 in Wellington.

References

1858 births
1916 deaths
19th-century New Zealand astronomers
Scientists from Glasgow
Scottish emigrants to New Zealand
People educated at Auckland Grammar School
20th-century New Zealand astronomers